The 2021 Alberta Curling Series: Saville Shoot-Out was held from September 10 to 13 at the Saville Community Sports Centre in Edmonton, Alberta. It was held as part of the Alberta Curling Series during the 2021–22 curling season. The event was held in a round-robin format with a $19,155 purse.

Teams
The teams are listed as follows:

Round-robin standings 
Final round-robin standings

Round-robin results
All draw times listed in Mountain Time (UTC−06:00).

Draw 1
Friday, September 10, 10:00 am

Draw 2
Friday, September 10, 5:00 pm

Draw 3
Saturday, September 11, 10:00 am

Draw 4
Saturday, September 11, 5:00 pm

Draw 5
Sunday, September 12, 10:00 am

Tiebreakers
Sunday, September 12, 2:00 pm

Playoffs

Source:

Quarterfinals
Sunday, September 12, 7:00 pm

Semifinals
Monday, September 13, 12:30 pm

Final
Monday, September 13, 4:00 pm

Notes

References

External links
Official Website
CurlingZone

2021 in Canadian curling
Curling in Alberta
September 2021 sports events in Canada
2021 in Alberta
Edmonton